Richard Bland College (RBC) is a public junior college associated with the College of William & Mary and located in Prince George County, Virginia. Richard Bland College was established in 1960 by the Virginia General Assembly as a branch of the College of William and Mary under the umbrella of "the Colleges of William and Mary". The "Colleges" system lasted two years. Although other institutions such as Christopher Newport founded as colleges of William and Mary became independent colleges and later universities, Richard Bland has continued as a junior college of the College of William and Mary. Though under its own administration, Richard Bland College is governed by William and Mary's Board of Visitors. It was named after Virginia statesman Richard Bland who lived in Prince George County where the campus is located.

History 
The rural campus was developed on a 750-acre site that was formerly a large dairy farm, that straddles the border of Prince George and Dinwiddie counties, just south of Petersburg. Prior to the Civil War, the property where the college now stands was part of a large plantation owned by the Gurley family. It became an important part of the Union-occupied territory during the Siege of Petersburg. The present campus was the scene of two battles during that campaign, the Battle of Jerusalem Plank Road and the Battle of Globe Tavern, both aimed at extending the Union siege lines to the west to capture the Weldon Railroad and cut the rail lines supplying Petersburg. Shortly before the turn of the century, the Hatcher-Seward family established a dairy farm on the former Gurley property.

In the early 1900s, a large grove of pecan trees was planted on the farm. During World War I the farm was used as a work camp for about twenty conscientious objectors. In 1932 the Commonwealth of Virginia authorized Central State Hospital to purchase the land for use as the Petersburg Training School and Hospital for African-American youth. In 1938, the Petersburg State Colony for the Negro Insane was chartered. That institution closed in 1959, and in 1960 the land and facilities still owned by the Commonwealth became the location for the establishment of Richard Bland College of The College of William and Mary.

The campus features a grove of century-old pecan trees, two restored turn-of-the-20th-century farmhouses (one of which now serves as the president's residence), an early 20th-century-dairy barn (which has been adapted as a theater) and an excentric koi pond. Because of the rural location, the administration has added residential student housing, which opened in the autumn of 2008; Richard Bland College is the only two-year college in the state to offer campus housing.

Campus 
The Richard Bland College campus includes buildings such as McNeer Building, SSHE Building, Freedom and Patriot Halls, Statesman Hall, and the library. The McNeer building is the main science and technology building. The SSHE (Social Studies, Humanities, and English) building houses classes based upon the liberal arts and humanities.  Freedom and Patriot Halls are the residential living dorms. Statesman Hall is the main gymnasium that features a weight-training room, and a court in which the Richard Bland College basketball team practices and plays. The campus library is where students have access to more than 67,000 books, over 64,000 e-books, and over 4,700 DVDs (most from an anonymous donor). They also may consult the Virtual Library of Virginia, which provides access to many full-text journal databases for students both on-campus and off-campus.

Residential halls 
The two main residential halls for students are Patriot and Freedom Halls. These residence halls offer students apartment-style living accommodations. The combined capacity of both halls is approximately 350 students.  To maintain the academic atmosphere, students who wish to live on campus must maintain a 2.5 GPA requirement. During the 2018 Spring semester, Commerce Hall became a student dorm but during the Winter semester of 2018, the dorm was shut down again.

Athletics 
Richard Bland College has an athletics program that includes both men's and women's sports. Men's sports include basketball, soccer, and golf. Women's sports include volleyball, softball, and soccer.

Notable alumni
Kirk Cox, 1981, Virginia politician, 55th Speaker of the Virginia House of Delegates
Javaid Siddiqi, 1998, Virginia Secretary of Education (2013–14).

References

External links

Educational institutions established in 1960
Public universities and colleges in Virginia
Universities and colleges accredited by the Southern Association of Colleges and Schools
Education in Petersburg, Virginia
1960 establishments in Virginia
College of William & Mary